Sturgis Brown High School is located in Sturgis, South Dakota and is part of the Meade School District.  Located east of Sturgis at 12930 E. Hwy 34, the school draws students from all over the city.

Notable alumni
 Raymond W. Carpenter, United States Army officer
 Carroll Hardy, NFL and MLB player
 Marty Jackley, Attorney General of South Dakota
 Megan Mahoney, professional basketball player
 Doug Miller, NFL player

References

External links

Public high schools in South Dakota
Schools in Meade County, South Dakota
Sturgis, South Dakota